Islam is a minority religion in Finland. The first Muslims were Tatars who immigrated mainly between 1870 and 1920. After that there were decades with generally a small number of immigration in Finland. Since the late 20th century the number of Muslims in Finland has increased rapidly due to immigration. Nowadays, there are dozens of Islamic communities in Finland, but only a minority of Muslims have joined them. Projecting from 2010 data, Pew Research Center estimated that in 2016 about 2.7% of Finland's 5.5 million population was Muslim. In the high migration scenario, Finland's Muslim population could grow to 15% by 2050 which would equal almost a million Muslims in Finland.

Baltic Tatars
The Baltic Tatars arrived in Finland as merchants and soldiers at the end of the 19th century. They were adherents of Sunni Islam and spoke one of the Turkic languages. They were later joined by other family members and formed the first Islamic congregation, the Finnish Islamic Association, which was founded in 1925 after Finland had become independent from Russia and in 1922 passed a law on religious freedom. In practice, this society only accepts people from Tatar origin, or Turkic origin in general, as members, excluding non-Turkic speaking Muslims.  The Finnish Tatars's Islamic congregations have a total of about 1,000 members these days. By and large, Tatars remained the only Muslims in Finland until the start of the 1960s.

Modern immigration 
By the early 1980s, several hundred Muslims predominantly from the Middle East and North Africa (MENA) had immigrated as students, laborers and spouses. In 1987 they formed the  association.

Due to the number of immigrants and refugees, the number of Muslims in Finland rose considerably in the early 1990s, predominantly they were from the aforementioned MENA countries as well as Somalia and the Balkans. Soon new immigrants established their own mosques and societies. In 1996 these groups came together to form a cooperative organ - the Federation of Islamic Organizations in Finland. It is estimated that approximately 1,000 Finns have converted to Islam. The vast majority of these are women who have married Muslim men.

By 2003, the number of Muslims had increased to 20 000 and there were about 30 mosques. The majority of Muslims were Sunni as well as some Shia refugees from Iraq.

Like most countries in Western Europe, Muslims tend to live in the larger cities of Finland like Helsinki, Tampere, Oulu and Turku.

Hundreds of Muslim asylum seekers and refugees from Iraq and Afghanistan convert to Christianity after having had their first asylum application rejected by the Finnish Immigration Service (Migri), in order to re-apply for asylum on the grounds of religious persecution.

In 2018, the Minister of Justice Antti Häkkänen ruled out the use of Islamic law in Finland.

Islamic societies 

There are dozens of independent Islamic societies in Finland. The oldest one is Finnish Islamic Association which was established in 1925. It has about 700 members of whom all are Tatars. The society has mosques in Helsinki, Tampere and Lahti. The only building established only as mosque in Finland is Järvenpää Mosque.

The Islamic Society of Finland was established in 1987. Its members are mainly Arabs, but also Finnish converts. The society has a mosque and Koran school in Helsinki. The Helsinki Islamic Center is currently the biggest society with almost 2,000 members. Furthermore, there are a dozen other Islamic societies in Helsinki region, some of them are not officially registered.

Most of mosques are multilingual, but the most commonly used languages are usually English and Finnish. Religious services are held in Arabic.

Demographics
The population of Muslims in Finland from 2008 to 2018 ,according to the Statistics Finland:

Muslim majority ethnic groups by language
Numbers are based on the Statistics Finland (language, 2019).

 Arabic language (30,467)
 Somali language (20,997)
 Kurdish language (14,327)
 Persian language (12,090)
 Albanian language (10,391)
 Turkish language (7,739)
 Bengali language (3,599)
 Urdu language (2,983)
 Bosnian language (2,322)
 Punjabi language (1,028)
 Chechen language (636)
 Uzbek language (604)
 Indonesian language (589)
 Azerbaijani language (467)
 Turkmen language (447)
Total: 102,696

Terrorism and radicalisation 
The ICCT report from April 2016 showed that at least 70 individuals had left Finland to enter the conflict zone and the majority joined jihadist groups in Syria and Iraq. They started leaving in the 2012-13 time span and the male-female ratio was about 80-20%.

The first terrorist attack in Finland was the 2017 Turku attack where Abderrahman Bouanane, a failed asylum seeker from Morocco, stabbed two women to death and wounded eight other people in his stabbing attack.

Islamic militants constituted the majority of those under surveillance by the Finnish Security Intelligence Service (SUPO) in 2020 and Finland is portrayed as an enemy state in Islamic State propaganda. The militant Islamist networks in Finland are multiethnic and span across generations, where the third generation of a number of Muslim immigrant families are radicalised. This leads to Muslim children growing up in a radicalized environment. The Foreign fighters in the Syrian and Iraqi Civil Wars movement has amplified transnational contacts for the Islamist movements in Finland. A number of militants have arrived from the conflict zone in Syria and the Al-Hawl refugee camp and constitute both a short and long term security threat.

Gallery

See also 
Turks in Finland
Finnish Islamic Party
History of Islam in the Arctic and Subarctic regions
Islam in Sweden

References

External links

 Report on Islam: Finnish Islam arises slowly (in Finnish).
 Finnish Islamic Congregation  (in Finnish).
 Some of the mosques in Finland (map)